Amos Ives Root (1839–1923) was an Ohio entrepreneur who developed innovative techniques for beekeeping during the latter 19th century, a period when the practice played an important role in the economy of many communities in the U.S. He founded his own company, which continues in business to the present day. His wide-ranging interests and curiosity led him to become the only eyewitness to publish articles about successful airplane flights made by the Wright brothers in Ohio in 1904–1905.

Career

Root began working as a jewelry manufacturer and took up beekeeping in his twenties as a hobby. Among his major contributions was a method to harvest honey without destroying the beehive. He became a nationally  and internationally known expert and a wealthy businessman.

Root founded his company in 1869 in his hometown of Medina, Ohio, to manufacture beehives and beekeeping equipment. At the peak of its business, the company was shipping four railroad freight cars of beekeeping equipment a day.

Root held strong Christian beliefs and wrote about his ideas and observations of contemporary society in a trade publication he started, Gleanings in Bee Culture. His book, "ABC of Bee Culture" was published in 1879 and continues to be updated in the present day as "The ABC and XYZ of Bee Culture."

During Root's tenure a piano was installed at the factory and employee breaks were mandated. During the break hymns would be sung and employees were prohibited from visiting the nearby tavern.

In the late 1890s Root's company started selling beekeeping equipment produced by competitor Dadant and Sons, Inc. The venture was unsuccessful and was discontinued. In 1928 the company began a transition into candle-making when a local priest made a request for high quality liturgical candles. The production of beekeeping equipment was reduced and eventually phased out.

The company, now known as Root Candles, is still owned by the Root family and is run by his great-great grandson.

The company's influence in its hometown is seen in the name of the Medina High School mascot: the "Battling Bees."

Visiting the Wrights
Always eager to learn about new technology, Root took great interest in the Wright brothers after reading sketchy newspaper reports about their 1903 Kitty Hawk flights and experiments in early 1904 in Ohio.

He combined his curiosity about flying machines with his enthusiasm for another recent invention, the automobile, and drove his 1903 model Oldsmobile runabout nearly 200 miles on primitive roads from Medina to the Wright hometown, Dayton, Ohio, hoping to learn more about the flying experiments. On September 20, 1904, he saw Wilbur Wright fly the first complete circle in an airplane. He wrote an article about the achievement for his Gleanings periodical, but delayed publishing the story until the following January at the request of the Wrights. He apparently saw several other flights as well. His report and follow-ups he wrote were the only published eyewitness accounts of successful flights by the Wright brothers at Huffman Prairie, a pasture outside Dayton where the brothers developed the first practical airplane. Root offered his reports to Scientific American magazine, but received no reply. His writing suggested the Wrights' invention would cause profound changes:

Helen Keller friendship
Root became interested in advances in educating blind and deaf children and contributed to that effort. In response he received a four-page letter from Helen Keller thanking him for his kindness and support. He remained friends with her for the rest of his life.

References

External links
Complete scan of "The ABC of bee culture" 1879 edition by A.I. Root
 WrightStories Famous Wright Airplane Flights

1839 births
1923 deaths
American beekeepers
Wright brothers
People from Medina, Ohio
Businesspeople from Ohio